Olena Golub or Holub (born December 25, 1951, in Kyiv) is a Ukrainian contemporary artist, media artist,  digital artist, collage artist, painter, art historian, representative of Ukrainian New Wave, member of the National Union of Artists of Ukraine (since 2003), and member of the  HEAA (since 2019). Her works have been exhibited internationally, including Germany, Netherlands, Belgium South Korea, Poland, and Austria. Museums with her art works include the National Art Museum of Ukraine, and Museum of Pannonhalma Archabbey, Hungary.

Biography 

Olena Golub was born on December 25, 1951, in Kyiv, in Soviet Ukraine, to an intellectual family. Her parents acted on stage as singers before her father, Yevgen Golub, became a journalist and her mother, Zinaida Morozova, became an official.

Golub graduated from Taras Shevchenko University of Kyiv in 1974, department of biophysics. She worked for some time as an engineer, but dreamed of becoming a professional artist. In the 1970s she refused to join the Arts' Academy, against creating compositions in the spirit of Soviet ideology. Thus, she took private drawing lessons from artists (Vasyl Zabashta, Vilen Barskyi, D. Zaruba, and S. Kaplan). In 1986 she graduated from the Institute of Journalistic Skill, Faculty Artists press.

She worked as an illustrator in magazines, and an editor at a publishing house. She is the author of more than 100 publications on contemporary art.

Her husband is culturologist Peter Yakovenko. Нer daughter is photographer Anna Golub. Her son Andriy Yakovenko is a designer and a sportsman in racing fast electric radio-controlled boats.

She lives in Kyiv.

Artistic career

Golub's career began with opposition to the Socialist Realism in a circle of underground artists, when she was writing in the style of Expressionism. Avant-garde young people in Kyiv founded an association, the Rukh Movement, in which writers, scientists, and artists gathered. In 1977 they organized an exhibition with artists including Golub, Yuriy Kosin, Nik Niedzelski, Mikola Trehub, Vudon Baklitsky, Alexander Kostetsky, and Nicholas Zalevsky.

Her memories about underground time and artists persons were published in the book The Bright and Gloomy days of Underground Artists.

Her artworks were inspired by Ukrainian avant-garde in the beginning of the 20th century, particularly by Wassily Kandinsky (Engineer's portrait, Empty plate, Two, etc.)

The second period in Golub's art career is associated with the revival of civic activities and the advent of private galleries, where she began to exhibit new works. Her paintings such as Aunt, Fisherman, and Chupa-chups, or the illusion of equality increased the social-critical motif with characteristics of Ukrainian humor.

In 2003, Golub began to create photo installations using computer technology. Art critic Nina Sayenko wrote:

Turning to contemporary computer technologies, the artist, as is her custom, pungently felt the pulse and rhythm of the time. By confronting and comparing various historical photographic materials she is in the process of solving philosophical problems of existence itself. The new series features the transformation of family traditions and generational ties along with the global transformation of conscience in material reviewing the totalitarian past (Yes and No, The Totalitarian Ballade, and Recipient Unknown).
Olena Golub calls upon us to return to human problems and perception of the human essence. In her works the fates of historical persons (Stalin, Hitler, etc) are closely interlaced with personages from family albums, who act together in the historical context. They pose questions about everybody's connection with and responsibility for everything that ever happened or is happening now (Who to Be With? and He, She, They...).
Today Olena Golub is on a new turn in her creative flight. One cannot but wish to become one of the characters she has created, the Yellow Hare, rising high above our omnivorous globalization and broad expansion of the mass media and fill oneself with the sense of freedom and independence."

In 2003, Golub began to create photo installations using computer technology. She frequently returned to human problems and reworked historical figures. Today, she continues working with new ideas, encompassing globalization in her work.

She has found considerable opportunities to create own visual language using digital technology and based on "mental structures", as she says.

A trend accentuated on digital technology in the arts she realized in the G. V. Kh. – group: Golub, Hlib Vysheslavskyi, Kharchenko. Their project "Digital yard № 3" was shown in Amsterdam, the Netherlands (2008).

Olena has often participated in the international media exhibitions "Matrix" HEAA, and in 2019 she became a member of this association. On the HEAA president Ágnes HAász's invitation she went to Budapest with a solo exhibition (curators Denes Ruzsa and Fruzsina Spitzer).

The Hungarian art critic Gabor Pataki noted:

"She calls her method as «narrative constructivism», in which you can see the embodiment of the ideas of the photomontage discoverers Rodchenko, Klutsis and Lissitzky. But while her predecessors constructed their works believing in a world that would soon become better and fairer, Golub can only acknowledge all these ideas as unsuccessful."

Awards 
 Laureate of the award National Union of Artists of Ukraine name Platon Biletsky 2021
 Award – 3rd prize (Marcil Lavallée Prize) to O. Golub, Ukraine, for Keys, Ottawa, Canada, 2020 
 Award-certificate of merit of "Matrices 2017" – International exhibitions of small electrographic artworks, Budapest, Hungary, 2017
 Award of "Matrices 2012" – International exhibitions of small electrographic artworks, Budapest, Hungary, 2012, in category "Hommage a Nicolas Schöffer"

Exhibitions 
 2022 – Identity. Aspects of modern photography in Ukraine. Apollonia, Strasbourg. 2022
 2020 – International exhibition ART IN THE TIME OF PLAGUE
 2020 – "Artificial Intelligence" – International Digital Miniprint Exhibition 15 Ottawa, Canada
 2018 – "Time spasm" the International Digital Art Miniprint Exhibition 13, Ottawa, Canada
 2017  –  12 International Digital Art Miniprint Exhibition, Ottawa, Canada
 2017  – an exhibition of electrographic art, Pannonhalma abbey museum and gallery, Pannonhalma, Hungary
 2017 – "Matrices 2017" – International Exhibition of Small Form Elektrographic Art, Budapest, Hungary, catalogue p. 50, 71
 2017 – Revolution of Dignity Art Exhibit, The Ukrainian Museum, New York
 2017 – "Metagraphical Imressions" –  O. Golub and W. Kharchenko, "Mykola House" gallery, Kyiv
 2015 — 10th International exhibition of digital art, Ottawa, Canada
 2015 — "True testimony: from the Revolution of Dignity to the present" National History Museum of Ukraine, Kyiv
 2015 — Digital Agora – 1 International Digital Art Triennial, Szekszard, Hungary
 2015 — Revolution of Dignity art Exhibit: Images from Ukraine's Maidan, 2013–2014, Wilson Center Washington, D.C., U.S.
 2014 —  9th International Digital Art Miniprint Exhibition, Ottawa, Canada
 2014 — "Invasion" – personal photo installation project, "Maysternia" gallery, House of Artists, Kyiv
 2013 — International print triennial Krakow-Falun, Dalarnas Museum, Falun, Sweden, catalog p. 150
 2013 — "In.print.out" – International Print Trienale, catalog p. 83
 2012 — "Matrices 2012" – International exhibitions of small electrographic artworks, Budapest, Hungary, catalog Pp. 51
 2011 – 10 years the Kyiv's Modern Art Research Institute (directed by Victor Sydorenko)
 2011 – "Impossible community", Contemporary Art Museum, Moscow, curator V. Miziano, Yevgeniy Fiks project "Portrait of the 19 million", photo installation
 2010 – Auction "Ukrainian alternative", catalog p. 51
 2010 – "Matrices 2010" – Biennial elektrohrafiky, Budapest, Hungary, the catalog Pp. 23, 53.
 2010, 2005 – exhibition "Special themes circuit", Linz, Austria
 2009 – Kyiv National Museum of Literature, photo installations, dedicated to Taras Shevchenko and Lesia Ukrainka
 2008 – "DIGITAL YARD № 3" – participant and co-curator of art group "G. V. Kh.", WG Kunst Gallery, Amsterdam, The Netherlands, 2008, catalog p. 1–9
 2008, 2007 – "Gogolfest" – International Art Festival, Art Arsenal, Kyiv – art works, dedicated to Nikolai Gogol
 2007 – "GIAF 2007" – Hayonhnam International Art Festival in Masan, Korea, prints, catalog st.112
 2006-2005 – "In the space Dubuffet" – exhibition joint with Nicoletta Montalbetti,photo collages. French Institute in Ukraine (Kyiv, Odessa, Dnepropetrovsk, Donetsk).
 2005 – "Birdinvest project", curator and member of the Ukrainian part of the International Project Borhlun, Belgium, catalog p. 42
 2005 – "Peace and War," Gallery of Kyiv-Mohyla Academy, the International Photobienalle "Second Month of Photography in Kyiv", catalogue p. 95–96.
 2005, 1985.1983 – International Biennial of humor and satire in the arts, Gabrovo, Bulgaria, catalog 2005, p. 125
 2004 – "Yellow Hare's Triumph", personal exhibition, "University" gallery, painting, graphics, photos, Kyiv
 2003 – International Print Trienale "Eurografik", curator Witold Skulicz, Kraków, Poland, catalogue p. 50
 2003, 2001, 2000 – I, II and III International Art Festival, Magdeburg, Germany, catalogs: I – "People and animals", P. 29, II – "Beyond everyday", Pp. 46, 130; III – "Signals of inexact time", S.123

Theoretical research 
As an art critic, Golub explores several directions.

 Alternative art in a broad sense, and in particular underground culture
 Art works created on the basis of new, digital, technologies
 The essence of the creative process in the modern world
 Art market lows and freedom of the artist
 Interaction of Ukrainian and Western art

References

Sources 
 in Hungarian:PhD Gabor Pataki. Olena Golub – «Wind from the River Dnipro». HEAA yearbook. 2019, pages 26–27. Budapest, Hungary, 2019 
 in Ukrainian: Peter Yakovenko.Visual thoughts.//Den(The Day), 2020 
 in Ukrainian: Olena Golub. The Bright and Gloomy days of Underground Artists.  Kyiv, Published House "Antiquary", 2017, 
 in Ukrainian: Andrew Yakubinsky. In Magdeburg remained Ukrainian "Angel". Den (The Day), 2000, October 6. 
 in Ukrainian: Alex Titarenko. People and animals. Den(the Day), 2001, February 23.
 in Ukrainian:Irena Bazhal.Briefly – the main thing.//Zerkalo Nedeli (Mirror Weekly), 2002, April 27.
 in Ukrainian: Ganna Sherman. Olena Golub: "In art I do research, and in science I do not shy away from emotionality" // Antikvar, 2022, January 6

External links 

 International exhibition ART IN THE TIME OF PLAGUE.2020 
 "Artificial Intelligence"  – International Digital Miniprint Exhibition 15 Ottawa, Canada, 2020 
 in Hungarian:  Pataki Gábor. Olena Golub – Dnyeper-parti szelek. P.26-27.2019
 Artists.de.Lena Golub
  Olena Golub in the NUAU.
 Nina Saenko. Two Olena Holub exhibitions to be held in January. // Den (The Day), 2004, January 27.
 Petro Yakovenko. Artistic chaos. Den, 2012, January 31.
 in Ukrainian:  Oksana Chepelyk. The new visual language of underground. Den (The Day), 2011, December 23.

1951 births
Living people
20th-century Ukrainian women artists
21st-century Ukrainian women artists
Ukrainian art critics
Ukrainian artists
New media artists
Ukrainian women painters
Digital artists
Women digital artists
Collage artists
Women collage artists
Postmodern artists
Taras Shevchenko National University of Kyiv alumni
Ukrainian contemporary artists
Ukrainian art historians